The 2009 China Open was a tennis tournament played on outdoor hard courts. It was the 11th edition of the China Open for the men (13th for the women), and was part of the ATP 500 Series of the 2009 ATP Tour, and of the Premier Series of the 2009 WTA Tour. Both the men's and the women's events were held at the Olympic Green Tennis Center in Beijing, People's Republic of China, from October 2 through October 11, 2009.

WTA entrants

Seeds

 seeds are based on the rankings of September 28, 2009
 Razzano became the 17th seed as Ivanovic withdrew due to upper respiratory tract infection

Other entrants
The following players received wildcards into the singles main draw:
  Han Xinyun
  Maria Kirilenko
  Lu Jingjing
  Yanina Wickmayer
  Zhang Shuai

The following players received entry from the qualifying draw:
  Kateryna Bondarenko
  Melinda Czink
  Olga Govortsova
  Ji Chunmei
  Alla Kudryavtseva
  Shahar Pe'er
  Urszula Radwańska
  Yaroslava Shvedova

The following player received the lucky loser spot:
  Vania King (replacing Ana Ivanovic due to upper respiratory tract infection)
  Galina Voskoboeva (replacing Gisela Dulko due to left adductor strain)
  Alexa Glatch (replacing Virginie Razzano  due to Left calf strain)

ATP entrants

Seeds

 seeds are based on the rankings of September 28, 2009

Other entrants
The following players received wildcards into the singles main draw:
  Marcos Baghdatis
  Marin Čilić
  Marat Safin

The following players received entry from the qualifying draw:
  Fabio Fognini
  Robby Ginepri
  Łukasz Kubot
  Florian Mayer

Champions

Men's singles

 Novak Djokovic def.  Marin Čilić, 6–2, 7–6(7–4)
 It was Djokovic's 3rd title of the year and the 14th of his career.

Women's singles

 Svetlana Kuznetsova def.  Agnieszka Radwańska, 6–2, 6–4
It was Kuznetsova's 3rd title of the year and 12th of her career.

Men's doubles

 Bob Bryan /  Mike Bryan def.  Mark Knowles /  Andy Roddick, 6–4, 6–2

Women's doubles

 Hsieh Su-wei /  Peng Shuai def.  Alla Kudryavtseva /  Ekaterina Makarova, 6–3, 6–1

References 

 
China Open
China Open
2009
2009 in Chinese tennis
October 2009 sports events in China